Thiruvananthapuram Orthodox Diocese is one of the 30 dioceses of Malankara Orthodox Syrian Church.

History
On 20 February 1978, the Malankara Syrian Christian managing committee recommended a division in Kollam diocese. According to Committee’s recommendation, Thiruvananthapuram Diocese was formed on 1 January 1979, after the division of Kollam Diocese. At the time of formation 94 parishes were under the diocese. From 1986 onwards, the orthodox Center at Ulloor has served as the bishop house.

Today
In 2010, a new diocese in the name of Kottarakkara Punalur Diocese was created after dividing the Thiruvananthapuram Diocese. There are 51 parishes in the diocese after the division.

Charitable and educational activities
The Charitable and Educational Society of the Thiruvananthapuram Orthodox Diocese is a registered society established in 1991 for starting and managing institutions of higher education in Thiruvananthapuram. The Society is sponsored by Thiruvananthapuram Diocese of Malankara Orthodox Church. Geevarghese Mar Dioscoros was the founder President of the Society. Baselios Mar Thoma Paulose II, the Catholicose of the East, is the patron of the Society. The metropolitan of the Thiruvananthapuram Orthodox Diocese, Gabriel Mar Gregorios, was the president of the Society . The society runs Mar Dioscorus College of Pharmacy (MDCP), Sreekariyam.

Diocesan Metropolitans 
Metropolitans

1)H.H Baselios Marthoma Mathews 1 (1979-1981)

2)H.G Thevarvelil Geevarghese Mar Diascoros (1981-1999)

3)H.G Mathews Mar Epiphanios (1999-2004)

4)H.G Dr. Gabriel Mar Gregorios (2005-present)

Assistant Metropolitans 

1)H.G Thevarvelil Geevarghese Mar Diascoros Episcopa (1979-1981)

List of Parishes

Cathedral
	St. George Orthodox Cathedral, Thiruvananthapuram

Parishes
	St. George Orthodox Syrian Cathedral, Palayam
	St. Bahanans Orthodox Church, Adichanalloor
	St. George Orthodox Church, Aduthala
	St. John's Orthodox Church, Aduthala
	St. Gregorios Orthodox Church, Alampara
	St. Mary’s Orthodox Church, Alamcherry
	St. George Orthodox Church, Anchel
	St. George Orthodox Church, Attingal
	St. Mary's Orthodox Church, Ayoor
	St. Mary's Orthodox Church, Channapetta
	St. George Orthodox Church, Chathannoor
	St. George Orthodox Church, Chengulam
	St. George Orthodox Church, Cheruvakkal
	St. Mary’s Orthodox Church, Chozhiyacode
	St. Thomas Orthodox Church, Elamadu
	St. Mary's Orthodox Church, Ezhamkulam
	St. Thomas Orthodox Church, Kampamcode
	Mar Bersowma Orthodox Church, Kattachel
 St. Mary's and St Jude Orthodox Church, Kazhakootam
	St. Thomas Orthodox Church, Kumarapuram
	St. Thomas Orthodox Church, Kulasekharam
	St. George Orthodox Church, Kulathupuzha
	Mar Aprem Orthodox Church, Kowdiar 
	St. George Orthodox Church, Makkulam
	St. George Orthodox Church, Malaperoor
	Mar Gregorios Orthodox Church, Malayinkeezhu
	Marthesmooni Orthodox Church, Mannoor
	St. Mary's Orthodox Church, Mannoor
	Mar Elia Orthodox Church, Meenkulam
	St. George Orthodox Church, Meeyannoor
	St. George Orthodox Church, Nagarcovil
	St. Mary's Orthodox Church, Nalanchira
	St. Gregorios Orthodox Church, Nanthankode
	St. Thomas Orthodox Church, Neeraikode
	St. George Mission Orthodox Church, Palavila
	Thekkan Parumala St. Gregorios Orthodox Valiya Pally, Peroorkada
	St. Dionysius Orthodox Church, Perukavu
	St. Peter's & St. Paul's Orthodox Church, Pooyapally
	Mar Baselios Mar Gregorios Orthodox Church, Sreekaryam
	St. Thomas Orthodox Church, Thazhamel (Anchel)
	St. George Orthodox Church, Thirumangalam
	St. Kuriakose Orthodox Church, Thumpode
	St. Thomas Orthodox Church, Vadakkamkulam
	St. George Orthodox Church, Varinjam
	St. George Orthodox Church, Varinjavila
	St. Peter's & St. Paul's Orthodox Church, Vattiyoorkavu
	St. Mary's Orthodox Church, Velimala
	St. George Orthodox Church, Vithura
	St. Mary's Orthodox Church, Thiruvithamcode
   St.Thomas Orthodox Syrian Church Chittazha

See also
 Malankara Orthodox Syrian Church
 Baselios Marthoma Paulose II

Notes

External links

 
 The Malankara Orthodox Church

Malankara Orthodox Syrian Church dioceses
1979 establishments in Kerala